Marco D'Arienzo (Naples, 24 April 181124 April 1877) was an Italian opera librettist.

D'Arienzo was a professional state official and, at the same time, a writer and librettist. From 1834 to 1837 he worked as a journalist for the Neapolitan newspaper L'Omnibus and was also author of Neapolitan songs, many of which were set to music by Saverio Mercadante. His comic librettos have been described as "witty and well presented" in spite of their involved plots.

Marco D'Arienzo was uncle of the composer Nicola D'Arienzo.

Libretti by D'Arienzo

References

Notes

Sources

1811 births
1877 deaths
Italian opera librettists
19th-century Neapolitan people
Italian male journalists
19th-century Italian journalists
Italian male dramatists and playwrights
19th-century Italian dramatists and playwrights
19th-century Italian male writers